Hazviperi Betty Makoni is a Zimbabwean women's rights activist who in 1999 founded the Girl Child Network, a charity which supports Zimbabwe's young sex abuse victims. The organization has rescued more than 35,000 girls and provided mentoring to at least 60,000 girls around Zimbabwe.  She earned two degrees from the University of Zimbabwe, and has been awarded numerous national and international awards.  Orphaned as a child and sexually abused, Makoni is the principal subject in the documentary film, Tapestries of Hope.

Early life
Makoni grew up in St Mary’s in the suburb of Chitungwiza. When she was six, Makoni was raped at knifepoint by a shopkeeper in her neighborhood who believed that raping virgins brings luck. Her mother died in a domestic violence incident when Makoni was nine. She was forced to raise herself alongside five siblings by working at a mission school.

Career
Makoni became a teacher after she received her university diploma. In 2000 she began permanently volunteering for the Girl Child Network. Many regional country's organizations have replicated the model implemented by Girl Child Network.  In 2012 her autobiography Never Again was published. The book was launched in Essex on 13 April 2013.

Accolades
In 2003 the Women's World Summit Foundation awarded Makoni with the Prize for Women's Creativity in Rural Life.
In 2007, Makoni won the World's Children's Prize for the Rights of the Child. In 2008, Amnesty International awarded her its Ginetta Sagan Award for her work with the GCN.

Personal life
Makoni left Zimbabwe in 2008, following torture threats. She now lives in England. She is married with three children.

See also
Virgin cleansing myth

References

External links
Girl Child Network

Living people
Zimbabwean activists
Zimbabwean women activists
1973 births
University of Zimbabwe alumni